Brandon Girtz (born March 6, 1985) is an American mixed martial artist. A professional competitor since 2008, Girtz has fought in Bellator and King of the Cage.

Background
Girtz was born and raised in Forest Lake, Minnesota. Girtz competed hockey until his sophomore year of high school, when he began competing in wrestling, having been persuaded by the school's head coach. However, Girtz did not find a wealth of success during his high school career, qualifying for the state tournament only once during his senior year and losing his first match. Girtz then attended Minnesota State University, where he continued wrestling as a walk-on. At Minnesota State, however, Girtz excelled, receiving NCAA Division II All-American honors.

Mixed martial arts career

Early career
Girtz started his professional career in 2008. He fought mainly for local promotions such as Brutaal Fight Night and Cage Fighting Xtreme.

With a record of eight victories and only two losses against UFC veterans Alvin Robinson and Eric Wisely respectively, Girtz signed with Bellator.

Bellator MMA
Girtz made his promotional debut against Michel Quinones on November 9, 2012, at Bellator 80. He won via unanimous decision (29-28, 29–28, 29–28).

Girtz was expected to face Treston Thomison on June 19, 2013, at Bellator 96. However, Thomison was replaced by Derek Campos due to undisclosed reasons. He lost via unanimous decision.

Girtz faced Poppies Martinez on October 4, 2013, at Bellator 102. He won via submission due to an armbar early in the first round.

Just two weeks after his last fight, Girtz replaced Cole Williams against Mike Estus on October 18, 2013, at Bellator 104. Once again he won via submission due to an armbar in the first round.

Girtz was expected to rematch Derek Campos in the quarterfinal match of Bellator season ten lightweight tournament on March 21, 2014, at Bellator 113. However, his opponent was changed and he faced Derek Anderson.  He lost the fight via knockout due to a knee in the second round.

Girtz faced Benny Madrid at Bellator 126 on September 26, 2014. He won the fight via TKO in the first round.

Girtz faced Melvin Guillard at Bellator 141 on August 28, 2015. Girtz won the fight via split decision.

Girtz finally rematched Derek Campos at Bellator 146 on November 20, 2015.  He won the fight via knockout in the first round.

Girtz faced Adam Piccolotti at Bellator 165 on November 19, 2016. He lost the bout by unanimous decision.

Girtz moved up in weight to face Fernando Gonzalez at Bellator 174 on March 3, 2017. He lost via unanimous decision.

Girtz faced Derek Campos in a third fight at Bellator 181 on July 14, 2017. He lost the rubber match by TKO via doctor stoppage at the end of the second round due to cut on Girtz's forehead caused by a Campos knee.

Girtz was supposed to face UFC veteran Jon Tuck at Bellator 227 but Girtz was forced to pull out due to injury.

Girtz next faced Myles Jury at Bellator 239. He lost the fight by unanimous decision.

Girtz faced Henry Corrales at Bellator 250. He lost the fight via split decision.

On April 19, 2021, it was announced that Girtz was released by Bellator.

Championships and accomplishments

Amateur wrestling
National Collegiate Athletic Association
NCAA Division II All-American out of Minnesota State University (2007)
NCAA Division II 157 lb: 7th place out of Minnesota State University (2007)
Reno Tournament of Champions
College Tournament 157 lb: 5th place out of Minnesota State University (2006)
MMAJunkie.com
2019 March Fight of the Month vs. Saad Awad

Mixed martial arts record

|-
|Loss
|align=center|16–10
|Henry Corrales
|Decision (split)
|Bellator 250
|
|align=center|3
|align=center|5:00
|Uncasville, Connecticut, United States
|
|-
|Loss
|align=center|16–9
|Myles Jury
|Decision (unanimous)
|Bellator 239
|
|align=center|3
|align=center|5:00
|Thackerville, Oklahoma, United States
|
|-
|Win
|align=center|16–8
|Saad Awad
|Decision (unanimous)
|Bellator 219
|
|align=center|3
|align=center|5:00
|Temecula, California, United States
|
|-
|Loss
|align=center|15–8
|Michael Chandler
|Technical Submission (arm triangle choke)
|Bellator 197
|
|align=center|1
|align=center|4:00
|St. Charles, Missouri, United States
|
|-
| Win
| align=center|15–7
| Luka Jelčić
| KO (punches)
| Bellator 190
| 
| align=center|1
| align=center|1:57
| Florence, Italy
|
|-
|Loss
|align=center|14–7
|Derek Campos
| TKO (doctor stoppage)
|Bellator 181
|
|align=center|2
|align=center|5:00
|Thackerville, Oklahoma, United States
|
|-
|Loss
|align=center| 14–6
|Fernando Gonzalez
| Decision (unanimous)
|Bellator 174
|
|align=center|3
|align=center|5:00
|Thackerville, Oklahoma, United States
|
|-
|Loss
|align=center| 14–5
|Adam Piccolotti
| Decision (unanimous)
|Bellator 165
|
|align=center|3
|align=center|5:00
|San Jose, California, United States
|
|-
| Win
| align=center| 14–4
| Derek Campos
| KO (punches)
| Bellator 146
| 
| align=center|1 
| align=center|0:37 
| Thackerville, Oklahoma, United States
| 
|-
| Win
| align=center| 13–4
| Melvin Guillard
| Decision (split)
| Bellator 141
| 
| align=center| 3
| align=center| 5:00
| Temecula, California, United States
| 
|-
| Win
| align=center| 12–4
| Benny Madrid
| TKO (punches)
| Bellator 126
| 
| align=center| 1
| align=center| 0:57
| Phoenix, Arizona, United States
| 
|-
| Loss
| align=center| 11–4
| Derek Anderson
| KO (knee)
| Bellator 113
| 
| align=center| 2
| align=center| 0:23
| Mulvane, Kansas, United States
| 
|-
| Win
| align=center| 11–3
| Mike Estus
| Submission (armbar)
| Bellator 104
| 
| align=center| 1
| align=center| 4:25
| Cedar Rapids, Iowa, United States
| 
|-
| Win
| align=center| 10–3
| Poppies Martinez
| Submission (armbar)
| Bellator 102
| 
| align=center| 1
| align=center| 1:20
| Visalia, California, United States
| 
|-
| Loss
| align=center| 9–3
| Derek Campos
| Decision (unanimous)
| Bellator 96
| 
| align=center| 3
| align=center| 5:00
| Thackerville, Oklahoma, United States
| 
|-
| Win
| align=center| 9–2
| Michel Quiñones
| Decision (unanimous)
| Bellator 80
| 
| align=center| 3
| align=center| 5:00
| Hollywood, Florida, United States
| 
|-
| Loss
| align=center| 8–2
| Eric Wisely
| TKO (arm injury)
| Driller Promotions / SEG: Downtown Showdown 1
| 
| align=center| 2
| align=center| 4:26
| Minneapolis, Minnesota, United States
| 
|-
| Win
| align=center| 8–1
| Mike Plazola
| Submission (rear-naked choke)
| Seconds Out / Vivid MMA: Showdown at the Sheraton 3
| 
| align=center| 1
| align=center| 0:43
| Minneapolis, Minnesota, United States
| 
|-
| Win
| align=center| 7–1
| Bobby Ferrier
| Submission (keylock)
| KOTC: Mainstream
| 
| align=center| 2
| align=center| 2:02
| Morton, Minnesota, United States
| 
|-
| Win
| align=center| 6–1
| Bobby Ferrier
| Submission
| Fight Fest 3
| 
| align=center| 1
| align=center| 2:45
| Somerset, Wisconsin, United States
| 
|-
| Loss
| align=center| 5–1
| Alvin Robinson
| Submission (rear-naked choke)
| Cage Fighting Xtreme
| 
| align=center| 2
| align=center| 1:37
| Red Lake, Minnesota, United States
| 
|-
| Win
| align=center| 5–0
| Drew Dober
| Decision (unanimous)
| VFC 29: The Rising
| 
| align=center| 3
| align=center| 5:00
| Council Bluffs, Iowa, United States
| 
|-
| Win
| align=center| 4–0
| Dan Merth
| Decision (unanimous)
| Brutaal Fight Night: This Brutaal's For You
| 
| align=center| 3
| align=center| 5:00
| Maplewood, Minnesota, United States
| 
|-
| Win
| align=center| 3–0
| Bruce Johnson
| Submission (rear-naked choke)
| Brutaal Fight Night
| 
| align=center| 1
| align=center| 2:00
| Maplewood, Minnesota, United States
| 
|-
| Win
| align=center| 2–0
| Robbie Kriesel
| Submission (guillotine choke)
| Brutaal Fight Night
| 
| align=center| 2
| align=center| 0:30
| Elko, Minnesota, United States
| 
|-
| Win
| align=center| 1–0
| Sam Keigley
| Submission (neck crank)
| Brutaal Fight Night
| 
| align=center| 1
| align=center| 0:38
| Shakopee, Minnesota, United States
|

Bare-knuckle boxing record

|-
|Loss
|align=center|0–1
|Jake Lindsey	
|TKO (doctor stoppage)
|BKFC 31
|
|align=center|2
|align=center|2:00
|Broomfield, Colorado, United States
|
|-

See also
List of male mixed martial artists

References

1985 births
Living people
People from Forest Lake, Minnesota
American male mixed martial artists
Mixed martial artists from Minnesota
Lightweight mixed martial artists
Mixed martial artists utilizing collegiate wrestling
American male sport wrestlers
Amateur wrestlers
Minnesota State University, Mankato alumni
Minnesota State Mavericks wrestlers